Amphitheriidae is a family of Mesozoic mammals restricted to the Middle Jurassic of Britain, with indeterminate members also possibly known from the equivalently aged Itat Formation in Siberia and the Anoual Formation of Morocco. They were members of Cladotheria, more derived than members of Dryolestida, and forming a close relationship with Peramuridae. Amphitheriidae is the only family of the order Amphitheriida.

Classification 
 Mammalia
 Yinotheria (monotremes and relatives)
 Theriimorpha
†Eutriconodonta
Theriiformes
†Allotheria
†Gondwanatheria
†Multituberculata
 Trechnotheria
 †Spalacotheriidae
 †Zhangheotheriidae
 Cladotheria
 †Meridiolestida
 Prototribosphenida
 †Amphitheriidae (here)
 Zatheria
 †Peramuridae
 Tribosphenida
 various extinct genera
 Theria
 Eutheria (placentals and relatives)
 Metatheria (marsupials and relatives

References

Further reading
Zofia Kielan-Jaworowska, Richard L. Cifelli, and Zhe-Xi Luo, Mammals from the Age of Dinosaurs: Origins, Evolution, and Structure (New York: Columbia University Press, 2004), 14,395.
Close RA., Davis BM., Walsh S., Wolniewicz AS., Friedman M. and Benson RB. 2016. A lower jaw of Palaeoxonodon from the Middle Jurassic of the Isle of Skye, Scotland, sheds new light on the diversity of British stem therians. Palaeontology, 59, 155-169

 
Middle Jurassic first appearances
Middle Jurassic extinctions
Fossil taxa described in 1846
Taxa named by Richard Owen